Yana Khan (born 6 September 2000) is a Kazakh short track speed skater. She competed at the 2022 Winter Olympics, in Mixed 2000 metre relay.

References 

2000 births
Living people
Kazakhstani female short track speed skaters
Olympic short track speed skaters of Kazakhstan
Short track speed skaters at the 2022 Winter Olympics
Competitors at the 2023 Winter World University Games
Medalists at the 2023 Winter World University Games
Universiade medalists in short track speed skating
Universiade silver medalists for Kazakhstan
21st-century Kazakhstani women